The Smoke is a British firefighter television drama that debuted on Sky1 on 20 February 2014. The series was created and written by Lucy Kirkwood and stars Jamie Bamber, Taron Egerton, Jodie Whittaker and Rhashan Stone.

The show was cancelled after one season.

Plot
The series describes the high-adrenaline adventures of White Watch, a team of London firefighters. Leading the crew is Kev, a good man injured and betrayed during the worst fire of his career. Standing by Kev's side as he returns to work is his gutsy girlfriend Trish and his cocksure friend and fellow firefighter Mal. Other members of the crew include the fearless Ziggy and the mysterious new boy Dennis.

Cast

Main
Jamie Bamber as Kev Allison, the leader of White Watch. 
Jodie Whittaker as Trish Tooley, Kev's supportive girlfriend.
Rhashan Stone as Mal Milligan, a member of White Watch and Kev's best friend.
Taron Egerton as Dennis "Asbo" Severs, the rookie of White Watch with a troubled past.
Pippa Bennett-Warner as Ziggy Brown, a member of White Watch.
Gerard Kearns as Little Al, a member of White Watch.
Dorian Lough as Billy "Mince", a member of White Watch.
David Walmsley as Rob, a member of White Watch.
Martyn Ellis as Big Al, station manager.

Recurring
Amit Shah as Nick Chandrakala, White Watch Commander.
Sam Gittins as Gog, the one responsible for Kev's accident.
Sinead Matthews as Julia Tooley, Trish's sister.
Elizabeth Berrington as Pauline Pynchon, a therapist.

Episodes

Reception
Sam Wollaston of The Guardian was positive, remarking the first episode, 'crackles along with a tidy script and some nice performances, though it's really more about plot than getting inside the souls of its characters.' Ellen E Jones of The Independent was also positive, remarking that, 'The script by fêted young playwright Lucy Kirkwood was also full of warm moments of the non-third-degree-burn-causing kind, like a raucous sing-a-long to Adele's "Someone Like You" in the back of the fire engine'. Tom Rowley in The Telegraph found it full of familiar cliches, but found it showed promise. The Times gave it four stars.

As the series broadcast, the London Fire Brigade used social media to send out fire safety tips and encouraged members of the public to tweet or post on Facebook their own fire escape plans.

See also
London's Burning
Steel River Blues
Chicago Fire

References

External links

2010s British drama television series
2014 British television series debuts
2014 British television series endings
Sky UK original programming
Television shows set in London
Television series by Endemol
Television series about firefighting